Thomas Allen Jenckes I (November 2, 1818 – November 4, 1875) was a United States representative from Rhode Island. Jenckes was best known for introducing a bill that created the United States Department of Justice. President Ulysses S. Grant then signed the bill into law on June 22, 1870. Jenckes was also an avid supporter of civil service reform.

Biography
Thomas Jenckes was born in Cumberland, Rhode Island on November 2, 1818. He graduated from Brown University in 1838. Jenckes was admitted to the Rhode Island  state bar in 1840. He was clerk in the Rhode Island state legislature from 1840 until 1844. From 1854 until 1857 he was a member of the State house of representatives. He was elected as Republican to the United States Congress in 1863 and served until 1871 when he lost a bid for reelection. He then resumed the practice of law in Cumberland.

U.S. House of Representatives
Jenckes was first elected to the U.S. House in 1863, defeating Democratic opponent Charles J. Bradley by seventeen percentage points. He was subsequently re-elected three times by landslide margins.

During his House tenure, Jenckes was mostly known for introducing legislation which created the United States Department of Justice. Contrary to some narratives that suggest this was an effort to bolster Reconstruction policies during the presidency of Ulysses S. Grant and safeguard the constitutional rights of blacks, it was primarily for the purpose of professionalizing legal practice. Indeed, Jenckes "paid little attention" to protecting Southern blacks.

Considered a "reformer," Jenckes was an early advocate of civil service reform and known as "the father of civil service." When he introduced legislation pushing it, fierce opposition was met by Radical Republican colleague John A. Logan of Illinois, who was concerned with the plight of Southern blacks and called the bill "probably unconstitutional." The enactment of a civil service system to replace the traditional spoils system would prevent Republicans from utilizing patronage to benefit blacks, and it was later implemented via the Pendleton Civil Service Reform Act years after Jenckes left office.

Having prosecuted fraud implicated in the Credit Mobilier scandal, Jenckes' tenure was also marked by his revisions of bankruptcy law and involvement in cases related to Goodyear rubber, the Corliss steam engine, in addition to patents pertaining to refrigeration and ventilation.

In the 1870 United States House of Representatives elections, Jenckes was defeated by fellow Republican Benjamin T. Eames.

Death
Jenckes died in Cumberland, Rhode Island on November 4, 1875, and is interred at Swan Point Cemetery in Providence.

References

Further reading
 Ari Hoogenboom, "Thomas A. Jenckes and Civil Service Reform," Mississippi Valley Historical Review, vol. 47, no. 4 (March 1961), pp. 636–658. In JSTOR

External links
 

	
	

1818 births
1875 deaths
Brown University alumni
People from Cumberland, Rhode Island
Civil service reform in the United States

Burials at Swan Point Cemetery
Republican Party members of the United States House of Representatives from Rhode Island
Republican Party members of the Rhode Island House of Representatives
19th-century American politicians